Hendrix is a small lunar impact crater that is located on the Moon's far side, deep in the southern hemisphere. Hendrix lies about a crater diameter to the south-southwest of the crater White, just beyond the outer rim of the enormous walled plain Apollo. This is a roughly circular, bowl-shaped crater. The rim is sharp-edged and not noticeably eroded. The interior is relatively featureless.

The crater is named after Don Hendrix.

Satellite craters
By convention these features are identified on lunar maps by placing the letter on the side of the crater midpoint that is closest to Hendrix.

References

 
 
 
 
 
 
 
 
 
 
 
 

Impact craters on the Moon